Graulich is a surname. Notable people with the surname include:

Billy Graulich (1868–1948), American baseball player
Günter Graulich (born 1926), German church musician and music publisher
Lew Graulich (1862–1934), American baseball player
Will Graulich (born 1992), English professional rugby union player